Delphine Jeanine Annie Réau ( Racinet, born 19 September 1973 in Melun) is a French sport shooter who competed in the 2000 Summer Olympics and in the 2012 Summer Olympics.

References

Sportspeople from Melun
1973 births
Living people
French female sport shooters
Trap and double trap shooters
Olympic shooters of France
Shooters at the 2000 Summer Olympics
Shooters at the 2008 Summer Olympics
Shooters at the 2012 Summer Olympics
Olympic silver medalists for France
Olympic medalists in shooting
Olympic bronze medalists for France
Medalists at the 2012 Summer Olympics
Medalists at the 2000 Summer Olympics
20th-century French women
21st-century French women